Jules Mersch (29 March 1898 – 1 May 1973) was a Luxembourgian publisher and writer, born in Luxembourg City.  He was the general director of Victor Buck publishing house, in which capacity he edited the National Biography of Luxembourg.  This work involved him writing, in large parts, articles about the main political families of the early years of the Grand Duchy, including the Metz and Brasseur families.

References
 

Luxembourgian writers
Male biographers
1898 births
1973 deaths
People from Luxembourg City